The men's high jump event at the 1987 Pan American Games was held in Indianapolis, United States on 12 August.

Results

References

Athletics at the 1987 Pan American Games
1987